Akite Agnes (born 19 March 1983) is a Ugandan stand-up comedienne, actress, MC, and philanthropist. She is popularly known for her role as Arach in the series The Hostel. She has also acted in Pearl Magic's Girl from Mparo as Mama Brian, the nosy neighbour. Her style of comedy reflects on the daily issues that people face as they go about their lives.

Early life and education

Agnes was born on 19 March 1983 in Kampala, Uganda, to Anthony Opio, an auditor, and Hellen Opio. She is the fifth of nine children. She grew up in Kitintale and later in Mutungo, suburbs of Kampala. She was raised a Catholic and went to St. Kizito Primary School, Bugolobi, where she did her Primary Leaving Examinations, and later to Our lady of Good Counsel, Gayaza, where she completed her secondary education. She did her Uganda Certificate Examinations (UCE) at Naalya SS, Namugongo and later went for her A levels to St. Lawrence Creamland Campus, where she did her UACE. She joined Makerere University in 2003, where she completed a Bachelor of Arts degree in tourism.

Career

In 2009, Agnes was approached by Anne Kansiime to act in a new TV comedy series called The Hostel after her friend, Pamela, had turned it down. She was given the part of Arach without auditioning. This was the beginning of her acting career. The Hostel was a popular series in Uganda, initially shown on NTV and later on DStv. Agnes stayed on the show for three seasons and left in 2012, as she was preparing to give birth to her second child, Brianna.

In 2014, she began her comedy act with a group called The Punchliners, after being persuaded by Anne Kansiime and Daniel Omara to try stand-up comedy. She later joined Comedy Files.

In 2015, she was part of the Queens of Comedy Uganda vs Kings of Comedy Rwanda in Kigali.

In 2016, she appeared in Girl from Mparo as Mama Brian, a series that aired on UBC and later on DSTV's Pearl Magic.

In 2018, when her contract with Comedy Files ended, Agnes started doing solo acts on different comedy platforms, including Rock Comedy and Comedy Store Ug, hosted by Alex Muhangi. In June, she appeared in the Kampala Comedy Festival, hosted by Okello Okello, a renowned comedian in Uganda. On her return to Comedy Stores UG in August, she impressed the crowd. The clip for that show went viral on WhatsApp, where she was heaped with praise. She attributed the popularity of the clip to Comedy Store, which has an active social media account, and Kakensa Media, which have a huge following on Facebook. Between August and November, Agnes was a permanent member of the UG Pineapple Comedy Tour, which took her to different parts of the country, including Mbale, Gulu, Fort Portal, Jinja, and Mbarara. She was part of the group from Comedy Store Ug that went to Mbarara for its maiden show outside Kampala. Agnes featured for the first time in the fourth episode of Africa Laughs on 8 October at Kampala Serena Hotel, hosted by Patrick Salvador Idringi, with other comedians such as Basketmouth, Alfred Kainga, Eddie Kadi, Mc Jesse, Professor Haimo, and Arthur Nkusi. In December, she resumed acting, this time with Fun Factory in a TV series called Mizigo Express, as Sam's girlfriend.

In early March 2019, Agnes created and hosted the Arise Woman! Comedy Jam on International Women's Day. In celebration of the holiday, the show comprised an all-female cast, which included Nancy Kobusheshe, Maggie the Bwaiserian, Rich Mouth, Dora Nakagga, Leila Kachapizo, and the Fun Factory ladies. Part of the proceeds of the show was given to charity. In late March, Agnes returned to Kigali as part of the Seka Fest, with comedians from Uganda, Kenya, and Nigeria. In April, she appeared on The Comedian's OutLuke Podcast, presented by comedian Luke Anthony as part of a Uganda Special. In July 2019, she was one of the Ugandan comedians who performed in the Laugh Festival in Nairobi, Kenya, and in September, she performed at the Uganda North America Association Convention in Chicago. In December, she headlined the One Africa Festival, in a bid to fight xenophobia at Port Elizabeth, South Africa.

In October 2022, Agnes was the opening act in Patrick Salvado Idringi's Africa Laughs sixth edition.

Style of comedy
Agnes' style of stand-up is observational comedy, where she points out the funny side of daily life. She also sometimes uses self-deprecation in her humour. She avoids political humour.

Personal life
Agnes is the fifth-born in a family of two brothers, Richard and Emmanuel, and six sisters, Cathy, Grace, Mary, Susan, Harriet, and Doreen. She is the mother of two children, Noel and Brianna, and is in a relationship with Brian Makalama. She is Catholic and attends Our Lady of Africa Church.

Philanthropy
Agnes is the co-founder and CEO of Arise Woman Foundation, which advocates for and empowers women and youth. Proceeds from the Arise Women! Comedy Jam have been donated to Home of Hope, Jinja.

Filmography

References

External links

 

1983 births
Living people
Ugandan stand-up comedians
Ugandan women comedians
Ugandan television actresses
People from Kampala
Makerere University alumni
Ugandan Roman Catholics